Letts is an unincorporated community in Sand Creek Township, Decatur County, Indiana. Letts once has a blinker light at highway 3 and main but to the discontent of many it has since been taken down.

History
Letts was laid out in 1882.

The Letts post office was discontinued in 1954. Allen W. Lett was an early postmaster.

Geography

References

Unincorporated communities in Decatur County, Indiana
Unincorporated communities in Indiana